China National Highway 203 (G203) runs from Suihua in Heilongjiang to Shenyang in Liaoning. It is 720 kilometres in length and runs straight south from Mingshui, going via Chongyuan.

Route and distance

See also
 China National Highways

Transport in Heilongjiang
Transport in Jilin
Transport in Liaoning
Transport in Shenyang
203